Nebojša Krstić (born 9 July 1957) is a Serbian media personality, political commentator, former musician (VIS Idoli) and physician. He is also a former public relations advisor to the office of the President of Serbia, appointed by Boris Tadić. Currently, Krstić is a strong supporter of the President of Serbia Aleksandar Vučić and his ruling Serbian Progressive Party.

Biography
Krstić matriculated from the First Belgrade Gymnasium and then obtained a university degree at the University of Belgrade's Faculty of Medicine. In 1985 he appeared in the film Šest dana juna. After finishing his studies, he worked in medicine for a decade, finding employment as a physician in several medical institutions including those on the island of Vis and Hyatt Regency hotel in Belgrade. After that, he began working in marketing, becoming director of the Nova, Young & Rubicam marketing agency.

Musical career

VIS Dečaci

In late 1979, Srđan Šaper and Krstić, both college students and non-musicians, decided to take up music and at a party made a deal with Vlada Divljan, Šaper's close high school friend, to form a band. Šaper would play the guitar, Krstić and Divljan drums. The band was called Dečaci (The Boys). At about the same time the band met Dragan Papić who was a photographer and who became the band's creative mediator. He made photos of the band and published it in the youth newspaper magazine "Vidici". The photos had subtitles mainly dealing with gay parody concepts.

In February, 1980 the band started rehearsing at Divljan's building where Zdenko Kolar, Divljan's close friend since primary school also lived. Krstić even played Kolar's bass and used his amp. On one occasion Divljan called Kolar with whom he played since 1968 to come to join the band. Soon the band was joined by Boža Jovanović, Divljan and Kolar's friend who played drums. At the same time, due to lack of progress Krstić and Šaper quit playing and became the non-musician part of the band mainly concentrating on writing. During the whole Dečaci euphoria, the public's eye was focused also on graffiti which could be seen on Belgrade's walls. Krstić was the author of the first Belgrade graffiti "Margita je dečak" ("Margita is a boy") dedicated to his friend Margita Stefanović who later was the keyboard player of Ekatarina Velika.

Idoli

On 1 March 1980 the band was renamed to VIS Idoli and held a rehearsal. The first song the band made at that rehearsal was  "Retko te viđam sa devojkama" ("I seldom see you with girls"), a gay themed song.
One month later, Papić made a deal with "Vidici" magazine to finance a recording of the first Idoli single at the "Druga Maca" studio owned by Enco Lesić who produced the single. "Vidici" published "Pomoć, pomoć" and "Retko te viđam sa devojkama" on the A-side of the single while the B-side featured Slobodan Škerović's narrative poem "Poklon". Krstić provided backing vocals and percussion. The band released another single, "Maljčiki", this time for Jugoton, a major record label, with the producer Goran Bregović. At Festival Omladina they appeared with the track "Zašto su danas devojke ljute?" ("Why Are The Girls Angry").

Idoli, with Električni Orgazam and Šarlo Akrobata participated in the project called Paket aranžman with four tracks, "Schwule Über Europa" (German for "Boredom Over Europe") (a parody on the attitude towards Germans) "Plastika" ("Plastic"), "Maljčiki" (Russian for "Boys", a parody on Socialist realism or Communism) and "Amerika" ("America"). The promotional video for "Maljčiki" was banned on national television and some radio stations after the Soviet embassy responded. With promotional videos and radio singles widely broadcast by major TV and radio stations, the band became one of the most popular acts in Yugoslavia. The public expected a new release and so the band entered the studio to record their debut. The result were only six tracks released on an EP but this turned out to be a success as it was sold at about 200.000 copies. In the meantime Kokan Popović became the band's drummer.

After releasing the VIS Idoli EP the band were given the opportunity to record the album and produce it by themselves which they did during Autumn and Winter 1981/1982. Odbrana i poslednji dani was released in early 1982. The record was sold in about 50.000 copies which was considered a commercial failure. The album was one of the first Yugoslav concept album inspired by Borislav Pekić book with the same title. Due to complex structure of the album, the audience did not accept the songs as the previous ones. The only track which became hit was "Kenozoik" for which Krstić provided lead vocals. He also was lead vocalist on "Glavna ptico (skrati svoj dugački jezik)" ("Main Bird" (Shorten Your Long Tongue)").

Due to dissatisfaction of Jugoton the next album had to be more commercial and easy to consume. The band, with Branko Isaković on bass, went to London and with producer Bob Painter recorded Čokolada, one of the best selling Yugoslav records. Krstić was with Šaper the main writer as Divljan was preparing a university degree at the time. Krstić provided lead vocals for the album title track, and "U gradu bez sna" ("In A Dreamless City"). When the Čokolada tour started the relationship between the band members became colder and after the Ljubljana concert the band ceased to exist. The last Idoli release was the soundtrack album for the Šest dana juna movie in 1985. Divljan wrote the lyrics and music while the rest of the band only recorded their parts. Krsić did not record with the band, as he was starring in the movie.

Post Idoli career

When Idoli disbanded Krstić and Šaper wrote music for singer Bilja Krstić. They also released an album in 1987 called Poslednja mladost u Jugoslaviji. For the recording of the album the two formed a band called Unutrašnja Imperija consisting of Gagi Mihajlović (guitar), Branko Isaković (bass) and Dragoljub Đuričić (drums). The album was released by Jugoton.

In 1995, Krstić and Šaper formed a supergroup called Dobrovoljno Pevačko Društvo with Piloti frontman Kiki Lesendrić. Krstić provided vocals and drum machine, Šaper did the vocals while Lesendrić played lead guitar, produced and arranged the songs. Nedelja na Duhove was recorded in Budapest in early 1995 and was released by Eastfield music. Guest appearances featured Aleksandra Kovač and Kristina Kovač, Milan Đurđević from Neverne Bebe, Istvan-Steve Alapi and Zoltan Metenyi. In 1996, both Krstić and Šaper appeared as guests on the Akcija self-titled album. Krstić is no longer in the music business.

Discography

With Idoli

With Srđan Šaper

Studio albums
 Poslednja mladost u Jugoslaviji (1987)

Singles
 "Razvod 1999"/"Parada" (1999)

With Dobrovoljno Pevačko Društvo
 Nedelja na Duhove (1995)

With Akcija
 Akcija (1996) - guest on the track "7 dana" ("7 Days")

Political career
Krstić joined the Democratic Party in 1992.
During Boris Tadić's presidential campaign, Krstić worked as his creative director and was in charge of the media presentation of the Democratic Party's candidate for the office of Serbian President.
Nowadays, he often appears as self proclaimed political analyst, strongly criticizing opposition, and speaking in favor of current political establishment in Serbia.

Personal life

In an exchange of words on Twitter, Krstic outed himself as a gay man, standing up against homophobia online.

References 

 EX YU ROCK enciklopedija 1960-2006,  Janjatović Petar;  

Biography of Nebojša Krstić General Secretariat of the President of the Republic

1957 births
Living people
Democratic Party (Serbia) politicians
Musicians from Belgrade
Serbian physicians
Serbian rock singers
Yugoslav rock singers
University of Belgrade Faculty of Medicine alumni
Yugoslav musicians